Sand Hill (1070+ feet or 326+ m) is the second highest named summit in the U.S. state of Indiana.  It is located in northeastern Wayne Township in Noble County, approximately two and a half miles southeast of the town of South Milford.  A burial ground known as Weston Chapel Cemetery is on the southeastern face of the hill.

The highest summit in Indiana is Hoosier Hill in Wayne County

Notes 

Hills of Indiana
Landforms of Noble County, Indiana